"California Breeze" is a song by American rapper Lil Baby, released from his third studio album It's Only Me with an accompanying music video on October 14, 2022. It was produced by Murda Beatz and MARS.

The song peaked at number four on the Billboard Hot 100, becoming the highest-charting song on the album.

Composition
"California Breeze" is a "moody and melodic" song that is built around a sample of "Gwen" by Coco O. Lyrically, Lil Baby centers on his success and luxurious lifestyle, as well as "mistrusting some, protecting others and keeping his bookings up".

Critical reception
The song received generally positive reviews. Shanté Collier-McDermott of Clash wrote of the song, "He floats on the beat, the second verse especially heartfelt." Carl Lamarre and Christine Werthman of Billboard considered it a "standout" from It's Only Me and praised the sampling on the track.

Music video
The official music video was directed by Ivan Berrios and sees Lil Baby enjoying a cruise in a yacht on a sunny day.

Charts

References

2022 songs
Lil Baby songs
Songs written by Lil Baby
Songs written by Murda Beatz
Song recordings produced by Murda Beatz